Darnian (also Romanized as Darnīān and Darniyan; also known as Darnūn) is a village in Sofla Rural District, in the Central District of Kharameh County, Fars Province, Iran. At the 2006 census, its population was 379, in 95 families.

References 

Populated places in Kharameh County